Shakarla (Şaqarlı) is a rural locality (a selo) in Starobelokataysky Selsoviet, Belokataysky District, Bashkortostan, Russia. The population was 331 as of 2010. There are 5 streets.

Geography 
Shakarla is located 16 km northeast of Novobelokatay (the district's administrative centre) by road. Sokolki is the nearest rural locality.

References 

Rural localities in Belokataysky District